Nostima duoseta is a species of shore fly.

Distribution
Australia, New Zealand.

References

Diptera of Australasia
Taxa named by Ezra Townsend Cresson
Ephydridae
Insects described in 1943